Karan Razdan (born 25 April 1961) is an Indian actor, writer and director, who works in Bollywood.

Career
He began his writing career with an unforgettable television show named ‘’Rajni’’ and then wrote produced and made his debut as director with a hit television show, Tehkikaat. He is famous for writing hit films like Dilwale, Diljale, Deewane, and Qayamat (script consultant). He has written and  directed some films with controversial themes like Girlfriend (2004), Hawas (2004), Souten: The Other Woman, and Mittal vs Mittal. Umar (2006) is an emotional film about retired Indian old men in England. He has written and directed Mr. Bhatti on Chutti, a comedy. Presently he has completed a film named Hindutva.

He also wrote and acted in the hit TV series of mid 80s, Rajani and he has written produced and directed the detective TV serial Tehkikaat starring Vijay Anand and Saurabh Shukla

Personal life
He was married to Rajani series actor, Priya Tendulkar, but the couple separated in 1995.  Later he married Arti Bhatti in 2002  who is now  known as Arti Razdan.

Filmography

As director
 Rajani TV series 80's
 Tehkikaat TV series (1994)
 ‘’Kisse Miyan Biwi ke’’TV series (1990)
 Mr. Bhatti on Chutti (2012)
 Mittal v/s Mittal (2010)
 Eight - Shani (2006)
 Souten: The Other Woman (2006)
 Umar (2006)
 Girlfriend (2004)
 Hawas (2004)
 ‘’Eena Meena Deeka’’ TV series
 Yeh Hai Raaz TV series (1997)
 ‘’Hindutva’’ (2022)

As actor
 Kasam Paida Karne Wale Ki (1984) – Chandrabhan
 Tum Laut Aao (1983)
 Disco Dancer (1982) – Sam Oberoi
 Jeevan Dhaara (1982) – Bus Conductor
 Zara Si Zindagi (1983) – Amit
 Shakti (1982) – News Reporter

Screenplay
Dilwale (1994)
Trimurti (1995)
Dushmani: A Violent Love Story (1995)
Diljale (1996)
Deewane (2000)
Love Story 2050 (2008)
’’Laxman Rekha’’ (1991)

References

External links
 
 Karan Razdan Filmography – Bollywood Hungama
 Books By Karan Razdan – Amazon.in

1961 births
Living people
20th-century Indian film directors
Hindi-language film directors
Male actors in Hindi cinema
Indian male television actors
Indian television directors
Kashmiri people